Byram is a village in the Selby District in North Yorkshire, England. Byram is the principal settlement in the civil parish of Byram cum Sutton.

The toponym is from the Old English bȳrum, the dative plural of bȳre, so means "at the byres or cowsheds".  Byram was historically a hamlet, part of the township of Byram cum Poole in the ancient parish of Brotherton in the West Riding of Yorkshire.  Byram cum Poole became a separate civil parish in 1866, but in 1891 was merged with the civil parish of Sutton to form the civil parish of Byram cum Sutton.  Byram grew rapidly in the 1950s and 1960s.  In 1974 it was transferred to the new county of North Yorkshire.

Byram Hall was a large country house east of the village, in Byram Park.  The estate was owned by the Ramsden family from 1628 to 1922.  The house was demolished in the 1950s, but a number of buildings remain in the park. The 18th century lodge is a Grade II listed building. The 18th century orangery has been converted into a house.

References

External links
 

Villages in North Yorkshire